Elections were held to the Council of States of Switzerland in October and November 2007 as part of the 2007 federal election.  All 46 members of the Council of States were elected from all cantons of Switzerland.  The first round was held on 21 October.  In eight cantons, not all seats were filled in the first round, and a second round was held on 11 November, 18 November, or 25 November.

The election was a breakthrough for the Green Party, which won its first two seats in the Council of States, and the Green Liberal Party (GLP), which won a seat only four months after it split from the Greens.  These gains – the first time minor parties had won representation in the Council of States since 1995 – came at the expense of the Free Democratic Party, which lost two seats, and the Swiss People's Party, which lost its seat in its stronghold of Zurich to the GLP.

Results
The Council of States election was not finalized with the first run on 21 October; twelve seats remained to be distributed in second round elections on 11 November, 18 November or 25 November 2007.

The second round saw a number of notable races, for instance the election for the second seat in Zürich, where SP candidate Chantal Galladé agreed to withdraw and support GLP candidate Verena Diener against SVP candidate Ueli Maurer, increasing the centre-left's changes in the second round. In St. Gallen, where no one was elected in the first round, FDP candidate Erika Forster and CVP candidate Eugen David, both incumbents, started a common campaign for reelection against SVP candidate Toni Brunner. Four candidates contested the election for the two seats in Tessin -- Dick Marty (FDP, over 40,000 votes in the first round), Filippo Lombardi (CVP), Franco Cavalli (SP) -- both of whom had over 30,000 votes—and finally Attilio Bignasca (Lega). The two incumbents from the FDP and CVP were reelected on 18 November.

The second seat for Lucerne was handed to CVP candidate Konrad Graber in so-called "silent election" when no other candidate filed to run against him in the second round. Graber had narrowly failed to be elected in the first round. The second mandate in Fribourg and Valais was also decided in this way.

By canton

Appenzell Ausserrhoden

Appenzell Innerrhoden

Aargau

Basel-Landschaft

Basel-Stadt

Bern

Fribourg

Geneva

Glarus

Graubünden

Jura

Lucerne

Neuchâtel

Nidwalden

Obwalden

Schaffhausen

Schwyz

Solothurn

St. Gallen

Thurgau

Ticino

Uri

Valais

Vaud

Zug

Zurich

References

Council of States (Switzerland)
Council of States
Elections to national upper houses